Anthony Razor Shines (born July 18, 1956) is an American former professional baseball player and coach. He played in Major League Baseball (MLB) during parts of four seasons for the Montreal Expos, primarily as a first baseman. He later served as a base coach for the Chicago White Sox and New York Mets.

Career

Playing career
Shines was born in Durham, North Carolina. He was drafted by the Montreal Expos in the 18th round of the 1978 MLB Draft out of St. Augustine's College in Raleigh, North Carolina.

The Expos assigned him to the Jamestown Expos in the New York–Penn League for his first season in 1978. He spent the next three seasons (1979–1981) with the West Palm Beach Expos of the Florida State League. Shines was promoted to the Memphis Chicks of the Southern League in 1981 and remained there through 1983, when he was promoted to the AAA Wichita Aeros of the American Association.

He made his Major League debut on September 9, 1983 as a pinch hitter against the New York Mets but did not get an official appearance because the Mets made a pitching change and he was subsequently pinch hit for himself. He played in two more games that season, as late inning defensive replacement against the Chicago Cubs on September 12 and as a pinch hitter on October 2 against the Mets. He recorded his first Major League hit in that at-bat, a single to left field off of Tim Leary.

In parts of four Major League seasons with the Expos he played in 68 games and had 81 at bats, 15 hits, one double, five RBI, one stolen base, five walks, a .185 batting average, .239 on-base percentage, .198 slugging percentage, 16 total bases and one sacrifice fly.  He also pitched an inning in a blowout loss to the Philadelphia Phillies in 1985.

He spent the majority of nine seasons with the Indianapolis Indians, and he became a local legend and fan favorite within the city of Indianapolis.

He became a free agent in 1990 and signed with the Pittsburgh Pirates, who sent him to the Buffalo Bisons, where he hit .170 in 42 games. When the Pirates released him during the season, he signed with the Mexico City Reds of the Mexican League.

He retired after spending 1993 in the Cincinnati Reds system.

On May 16, 2006, the Indianapolis Indians honored Shines, who was managing the visiting Charlotte Knights, with a "Razor Shines Night." Shines kept his residence in Indianapolis during his playing years and for a few years afterwards. After retirement, he began his coaching career there at a local baseball academy and at Bishop Chatard High School.  Shines also coached at Lebanon High School in Lebanon, Indiana, for the 1997–1998 season.

Coaching and managing career
He later became a minor league manager, where he managed the Birmingham Barons of the Southern League and the Clearwater Threshers of the Florida State League.

Shines has over 500 wins as a minor league manager.

In 2007, he was back in Major League Baseball, coaching at third base for the Chicago White Sox.

On December 12, 2007, Shines was named manager of the Phillies single-A Clearwater Threshers team. He managed the Threshers to a 64-76 record in 2008.

Shines served as the first base coach for the New York Mets for the 2009 and 2010 seasons. In 2011, he was replaced by Mookie Wilson. In 2012, he was the hitting coach for the Great Lakes Loons, the A team of the Los Angeles Dodgers. In 2013, he became the manager of the Loons and in 2014 he was promoted to manager of the Chattanooga Lookouts in the Double-A Southern League. The Dodgers switched Double-A affiliates for 2015, and Shines became the manager of the Tulsa Drillers of the Texas League. Despite being chosen by Baseball America as the best managerial prospect in the Texas League, Shines' contract was not renewed by the Dodgers after the season.

Personal

His son, Devin, played baseball for the Cowboys at Oklahoma State and was drafted by the Dodgers in the 38th round of the 2011 MLB Draft. In 2012, Devin played for his dad with the Great Lakes Loons.

In 2009, Shines was named by Maxim as having "the most bad-ass name of all time". "Razor" is a family name. It was his grandfather's middle name and his father's middle name. His son's middle name is also "Razor."

Shines became a spokesman for Aquafina water during the 2009 season and was featured on its website as "The 3rd Base Coach of Life." Visitors to the site could ask yes or no questions and receive "advice" from Shines.

Sources

External links

, or SABR Biography Project

1956 births
Living people
African-American baseball coaches
African-American baseball managers
African-American baseball players
Águilas del Zulia players
American expatriate baseball players in Canada
American expatriate baseball players in Mexico
Baseball players from North Carolina
Birmingham Barons managers
Buffalo Bisons (minor league) players
Chicago White Sox coaches
Chattanooga Lookouts managers
Diablos Rojos del México players
Indianapolis Indians players
Jamestown Expos players
Major League Baseball first basemen
Major League Baseball first base coaches
Major League Baseball third base coaches
Memphis Chicks players
Montreal Expos players
Navegantes del Magallanes players
New York Mets coaches
St. Augustine's Falcons baseball players
Sun City Rays players
West Palm Beach Expos players
Wichita Aeros players
Sportspeople from Durham, North Carolina
American expatriate baseball players in Venezuela
21st-century African-American people
20th-century African-American sportspeople